Manchester Union Station was a union station in Manchester, New Hampshire for passenger trains passing through the city. It was built in 1898, and by 1910 it was used only for Boston and Maine Railroad trains.

Location
The station was situated a short distance east of the Merrimack River. It was at the foot of Depot Street, and was near the intersection of Canal and Granite streets.

Passenger services
During the 1940s peak of railway travel, passenger service included these named trains:
Ambassador and New Englander, a night train, Boston - Montreal, taking a route through Montpelier and Essex Falls in central Vermont
Alouette and Red Wing, a night train, Boston - Montreal, taking a route through Wells River and St. Johnsbury in northern Vermont; in Newport, Vermont coach passengers on the Red Wing could change to the Connecticut Yankee, bound for Sherbrooke and Quebec City (a sleeping car splitting from the Red Wing directly hitched to the Connecticut Yankee)

It also served trains that in Lowell, Massachusetts connected with the direct New York - Portland, Maine train that bypassed Boston, the State of Maine Express

The station served local trains to Boston via Methuen and Lawrence, Massachusetts, and trains north through Concord, Laconia and Plymouth to Woodsville. Additionally, it served east–west trains to Portsmouth on the Atlantic coast.

Demise
By the end of the 1950s the number of trains had declined, with the unnamed remnant of the Ambassador being the only Montreal-bound train. The station was demolished in 1962. Yet a train still went through the city to White River Junction, Vermont, where connections could be made to the New Haven Railroad's Montrealer. And service continued through Manchester to Concord. Service in Manchester ended in 1967 with the discontinuing of the Boston-Concord train.

References

Railway stations in the United States opened in 1898
Railway stations closed in 1962
Demolished railway stations in the United States
Former railway stations in New Hampshire
Stations along Boston and Maine Railroad lines
Manchester, New Hampshire